Balai Gadang Mungo Grand Mosque is an old mosque in Indonesia, located in Jorong Balai Gadang Bawah, Nagari Mungo, Luhak District, Lima Puluh Kota Regency, West Sumatra. The mosque was built in 1914, making it one of the oldest mosques in Indonesia, and the oldest mosque in Nagari Mungo.

History 
Construction of the mosque begun in 1914, which was initiated by one of the prominent ulamas (clerics) in Nagari Mungo named Haji Badu Ghani. Initially the building had only a floor and wall made of bamboo with a palm fiber, thus it was burned down during a long dry season in Nagari Mungo in 1918. Around a year later, Haji Badu Ghani invited two nephews, Haji Sultan and Haji Syarbaini to re-build the mosque. With the support of many parties, including the traditional leaders such as Tuanku Nan Balimo, reconstruction of the mosque was completed in 1920.

In 2012, the mosque was designated as one of the eleven locations of the 35th anniversary of the District of Limapuluh Kota in Luhak, held from June 25 to 28, 2012.

See also 

 Islam in Indonesia
 List of mosques in Indonesia

References 
 Footnotes

 Bibliography

 
 

Buildings and structures in West Sumatra
Cultural Properties of Indonesia in West Sumatra
Mosques completed in 1914
Mosques in Indonesia
Balai